O. japonica  may refer to:
 Obesotoma japonica, a sea snail species
 Olivella japonica, a sea snail species
 Orixa japonica, a shrub of Japan and Korea
 Osmunda japonica, the Japanese royal fern or Japanese flowering fern, a fern species native to eastern Asia, including Japan, China, Korea, Taiwan and the far east of Russia on Sakhalin
 Ostrya japonica, the Japanese hop-hornbeam, a tree species native to Japan, Korea and China

See also
 Japonica (disambiguation)